Thomas Sabo GmbH & Co. KG is a German manufacturer of jewellery and watches. It was founded in 1984 in Lauf an der Pegnitz, Germany by Thomas Sabo. The company engages in designing, manufacturing, and distributing jewellery and watches.

See also
Thomas Sabo Ice Tigers

References

External links
Official site

Companies based in Bavaria
Companies established in 1984
German brands
Jewellery companies of Germany
Watch manufacturing companies of Germany
Watch brands